HNLMS Van Amstel may refer to following ships of the Royal Netherlands Navy:

 , a  launched in 1943 as USS Burrows, renamed on transfer to the Netherlands in 1950; she was scrapped in 1968
 , a  launched in 1990

Royal Netherlands Navy ship names